The Evangelical Church Three Kings (a Portuguese name meaning Igreja Três Reis Magos) was opened the first temple on January 6, 1833. It was the first Lutheran Church built in Novo Hamburgo and considered one of the first ones in Rio Grande do Sul state. It was a simple house made of mud (enxaimel style).
A new temple was renovated in 1846, without the external features of the old one because the style was forbidden by the constitution of the empire. 

In 1895 the community decided to buy three bells from Bochum, Germany, and began to build the church tower. Three years later, the construction was completed. 

Finally, in 1926, the current temple was opened for community.

Novo Hamburgo
Religious buildings and structures in Rio Grande do Sul
Lutheran churches in Brazil